I Hate Myselfie is a memoir by American YouTuber Shane Dawson released on March 10, 2015. In it, he recounts eighteen of his most embarrassing and inspiring  life stories. 

His book is a New York Times and Wall Street Journal bestseller according to Simon & Schuster.

References

2015 non-fiction books
American non-fiction books
Books by YouTubers
Debut books
Essay collections
Shane Dawson